List of reproductive issues may refer to:
 Bioethics issues
 Gynecologic diseases